Yang Han-been  (born 30 August 1991) is a South Korean professional footballer who plays as a goalkeeper for J1 League club Cerezo Osaka.

Club career

Yang started his career with Gangwon FC.

In 2013, Yang transferred to Seongnam Chunma Ilhwa (now Seongnam FC).

In 2014, Yang signed to FC Seoul.

In 2023, Yang announcement officially transfer to J1 club, Cerezo Osaka for upcoming 2023 season.

References

External links 

1991 births
Living people
Association football goalkeepers
South Korean footballers
Gangwon FC players
Seongnam FC players
FC Seoul players
Cerezo Osaka players
K League 1 players
J1 League players